Roads in Fraser's Hill, Federal Route 422, were a series of federal roads in Fraser's Hill, Pahang, Malaysia from 1920s to 2018 before being downgraded to state roads. The roads are maintained by the Malaysian Public Works Department (JKR) and the Fraser's Hill Development Corporation (FHDC).

There are eleven federal roads (Federal Route 422) in Fraser's Hill including Jalan Mager, Jalan Valley, Jalan Peninjau, Jalan Genting, Jalan Lady Guillemard, Jalan Lady Maxwell, Jalan Quarry, Jalan Red Cross, Jalan Richmond, Jalan Pine Tree and Jalan Megador.

On 30 July 2018, the Malaysian Public Works Ministry had decommissioned the entire FT422 to become state roads operated by JKR Pahang and JKR Selangor.

Roads in Fraser's Hill

References

Former Malaysian Federal Roads
Roads in Pahang
Roads in Selangor